= Uwe Ebert =

German footballer

Personal information
- Date of birth: 6 March 1945 (age 81)
- Place of birth: Hildesheim, Germany
- Position: Goalkeeper

Senior career*
Years	Team	Apps	(Gls)
1966–1976	SV Darmstadt 98		

Managerial career
- 1987: SV Darmstadt 98 (caretaker)
- 1990: SV Darmstadt 98 (caretaker)
- 1991: SV Darmstadt 98 (caretaker)
- * Club domestic league appearances and goals

Uwe Ebert (born 6 March 1945) is a retired German football goalkeeper.
